William John Robertson (31 March 1879 – 19 December 1957) was an Australian rules footballer who played with Geelong in the Victorian Football League (VFL).

Notes

External links 

1879 births
1957 deaths
Australian rules footballers from Victoria (Australia)
Geelong Football Club players
People educated at Geelong College